The greater sheath-tailed bat or New Guinea sheath-tailed bat (Emballonura furax) is a species of sac-winged bat in the family Emballonuridae. It is endemic to New Guinea and some nearby islands.

References

Emballonura
Bats of Oceania
Mammals of Papua New Guinea
Mammals of Western New Guinea
Mammals described in 1911
Taxa named by Oldfield Thomas
Taxonomy articles created by Polbot
Bats of New Guinea